Ferdinand I and His Family is a 1782 oil on canvas painting by Angelica Kauffman, now in Room 37 of the National Museum of Capodimonte in Naples.

It was produced during the artist's stay in Naples between 1782 and 1783. She gained the commission after becoming a close friend of Ferdinand I's wife Maria Carolina. The couple are shown in the centre, with their children Maria Theresa and Francis in a group to the left and Maria Cristina, Maria Luisa, Maria Amalia and Gennaro Giuseppe (who died in infancy) in a group to the right.

Kauffman completed it in Rome, where the work was praised by Ippolito Pindemonte. During the 19th century it was put on display in the portrait gallery of the Capodimonte Palace.

Sources
https://web.archive.org/web/20150402202933/http://www.polomusealenapoli.beniculturali.it/museo_cp/cp_scheda.asp?ID=44
Mario Sapio, Il Museo di Capodimonte, Napoli, Arte'm, 2012. 
Touring Club Italiano, Museo di Capodimonte, Milano, Touring Club Editore, 2012. 

18th-century portraits
Paintings in the collection of the Museo di Capodimonte
Group portraits
Paintings by Angelica Kauffman
1782 paintings